SC2 (Sun Centre 2) is a leisure complex in Rhyl, United Kingdom.

History 
The original Sun Centre waterpark closed in February 2014. Denbighshire council had withdrawn funding from the company which operated it and as a result the not-for-profit firm could no longer afford to keep it open. In May 2016, the council submitted plans to demolish the waterpark and build a replacement facility.

The facility was opened in 2019, five years after the closure of Rhyl Sun Centre.

Facilities 
The complex has an indoor and outdoor waterpark with water slides and play areas for young children. Separate from the waterpark, there is also a "Ninja Tag" attraction.

References 

Water parks in the United Kingdom
Rhyl
2019 establishments in Wales